Gałąźnia Mała  (German Klein Gansen) is a village in the administrative district of Gmina Kołczygłowy, within Bytów County, Pomeranian Voivodeship, in northern Poland. Before 1945 the area was German.

At the end of World War II, in March 1945, the region was occupied by the Soviet Army. After the war ended the town became part of Poland. The last Germans had to leave the village in October 1948.

The village has a population of 132.

References

Villages in Bytów County